was a video game development company founded in 2000 by Tetsuo Mizuno and Chihiro Fujioka in Tokyo, Japan. In partnership with Nintendo, it produced software for the Game Boy Color, Game Boy Advance, Nintendo DS, Nintendo 3DS, and Nintendo Switch, including the Mario & Luigi series. The company's staff included former developers from Square, such as Yoshihiko Maekawa. On October 1, 2019, AlphaDream was shut down after filing for bankruptcy.

History
AlphaDream is a spinoff company from  a staffing agency that dealt in construction work also known as  Chihiro Fujioka joined AlphaStar in 1999 to head up a video game production division. He and Tetsuo Mizuno spun the company off as AlphaStar Software on January 12, 2000, before renaming it to AlphaDream in July of that year. Several members of their staff had previously worked at Square, including Mizuno, Square's second president, and Fujioka and Yoshihiko Maekawa, who were game directors at Square. The name AlphaDream, meaning the 'first dream', is a play on Final Fantasy, Square's most notable series.

The company is known for their role-playing games, most notably the Mario & Luigi series for the Game Boy Advance, the Nintendo DS and the Nintendo 3DS. Their first game, Koto Battle, was a Pokémon-style role-playing game, wherein the player battles three of their twenty character cards against AI opponents. It was released in March 2001 for the Game Boy Color. While it remains a Japan-only game, it was later re-released for the Nintendo 3DS Virtual Console.

AlphaDream's next game was Tomato Adventure, released in January 2002. The player, as DeMille, a tomato-hater in the Ketchup Kingdom, fights his way from his outcast village to rescue his girlfriend. The in-game weapons are toy-like and the battles against opponents involve minigames.

Tomato Adventure was co-developed with Graphic Research and directed by Chihiro Fujioka of Super Mario RPG and Final Fantasy Legend III. It was expected for release on the Game Boy Color as Gimmick Land, but was pushed to the new Game Boy Advance and renamed for better marketing. Tomato Adventure has not been released outside Japan.

AlphaDream became the developer of the Mario & Luigi series of games shortly after, with the first entry in the series, Mario & Luigi: Superstar Saga, releasing in 2003.

On October 1, 2019, AlphaDream declared bankruptcy, citing sluggish revenues and high development costs, and being unable to keep up with growing debt (which as of March 2018 was over ¥465 million).

Games

Notes

References

External links
  

Defunct video game companies of Japan
Japanese companies established in 2000
Video game companies established in 2000
Japanese companies disestablished in 2019
Video game companies disestablished in 2019
Video game development companies
Software companies based in Tokyo
Companies that have filed for bankruptcy in Japan